WFAR (93.3 FM) is a radio station licensed to serve Danbury, Connecticut.  The station is owned by Danbury Community Radio, Inc.  It airs a Christian radio format from 2 a.m. to 2 p.m. each day with the remaining time filled by a variety of ethnic and local programming blocks. The station broadcasts in English, Spanish, Portuguese, and Italian.

The station was assigned the WFAR call letters by the Federal Communications Commission on January 20, 1984.

See also
List of community radio stations in the United States

References

External links
 WFAR official website

Community radio stations in the United States
FAR
FAR
Radio stations established in 1981
1981 establishments in Connecticut
Portuguese-language radio stations in the United States